Luke Northmore (born 16 March 1997) is an English rugby union player. He plays at centre.

Club career
Northmore played for his university, Cardiff Met.

He then moved to Harlequins in the Premiership Rugby. He was a replacement in the Premiership final against Exeter on 26 June 2021 as Harlequins won the game 40–38 in the highest scoring Premiership final ever.

International career
He was called up to the senior England squad for the 2022 Six Nations Championship.

References

External links
Harlequins Profile
ESPN Profile
Ultimate Rugby Profile

1997 births
Living people
English rugby union players
Rugby union players from Tavistock
Rugby union centres